Frank Giroud (3 May 1956 – 13 July 2018) was a French comics writer.

Early life
Giroud was born on May 3, 1956 in Toulouse, France. He graduated from the École Nationale des Chartes, and he passed the agrégation in History.

Career
Giroud taught History in Milan and Grenoble.

Giroud was a comics writer. He wrote the text for Louis la Guigne, drawn by Jean-Paul Dethorey. He also wrote the text for Mandrill, drawn by Barly Baruti, as well as Oubliés d’Annam and Azrayen, drawn by Christian Lax. In 2000, he created Le Décalogue, published by Glénat Editions.

Giroud was awarded the Max & Moritz Prize for Best International Writer in 2002.

Death
Giroud died on July 13, 2018, at 62.

References

External links
 Lambiek Comiclopedia article.

1956 births
2018 deaths
Writers from Toulouse
École Nationale des Chartes alumni
French comics writers